Ebenezer Edwards (30 July 1884 – 6 July 1961) was a trade unionist and politician in Britain.

Born in Chevington, near Broomhill, Northumberland, Edwards went down the coal mine at the age of 12.  In 1906, he joined the Independent Labour Party, although he left after three years.  In 1908, he attended Ruskin College in Oxford for ten months, but had to leave due to a lack of finances.  After leaving the course, he became an early member of the Plebs' League and began to espouse Marxism.

Edwards continued working as a miner during World War I.  A supporter of Robert Smillie, he opposed the war.  He narrowly missed election to Parliament at the 1918 Wansbeck by-election, standing as a local Labour Party candidate, losing to Robert Mason.  He lost in Wansbeck again at the 1918 general election.

Long active in the Miners' Federation of Great Britain (MFGB), Edwards was elected to increasingly important posts in the union.  In 1929, he was finally elected to Parliament, as the Labour MP for Morpeth, succeeding Smillie, but lost his seat at the 1931 election.  Elected as vice-president of the MFGB in 1929, he became president in 1931 and secretary in 1932.  He also served in various posts at the Miners' International Federation.

Edwards supported the MFGB's reconstitution as the National Union of Mineworkers (NUM), and became the NUM's first secretary in 1945, but stepped down the following year to serve on the National Coal Board, keeping this post until 1953.

References

 Andrew Taylor, "Edwards, Ebenezer (1884–1961)", Oxford Dictionary of National Biography, Oxford University Press, 2004.

External links 
 

1884 births
1961 deaths
Trade unionists from Northumberland
Labour Party (UK) MPs for English constituencies
Miners' Federation of Great Britain-sponsored MPs
UK MPs 1929–1931
General Secretaries of the National Union of Mineworkers (Great Britain)
Members of the General Council of the Trades Union Congress
Presidents of the Trades Union Congress
Presidents of the National Union of Mineworkers (Great Britain)
Vice Presidents of the National Union of Mineworkers (Great Britain)
Plebs' League members